Anne-France Dautheville (born ) is a French journalist and writer, noted for being the first woman to motorcycle solo around the world.

Motorcycle travels
Dautheville grew up in Paris. In 1972, she participated in the Orion-Raid motorcycle tour, riding solo on a Moto Guzzi 750 from France to Isfahan, Iran, and continuing on to Afghanistan. In 1973, she became the first woman to motorcycle solo around the world, covering 12,500 miles over three continents riding a Kawasaki 125. During this time, she was a freelance journalist, and she supported herself by writing about her travels. She continued her world travels until 1981.

Travelogues
Dautheville's books Une Demoiselle sur une Moto (Girl on a Motorcycle), published in 1973, and Et J'ai Suivi le Vent (And I Followed the Wind), published in 1975, document her travels.

Fashion
French fashion house Chloé used Dautheville as the inspiration for its fall 2016 fashion show. Designer Clare Waight Keller said that she wanted to evoke Dautheville's "amazing sense of adventure, daring and courage but also the curiosity of travelling." Waight Keller explained: "She had a boyish cool attitude but she also took these amazing dresses with her which she threw her sweaters and biker jackets over. I wanted to bring that lived in quality to the collection."

Published works

Further reading

References

Motorcycle journalists
Long-distance motorcycle riders
1940s births
Living people
Year of birth uncertain